Jerzy Julian Hoffman (born 15 March 1932) is a Polish director, screenwriter, and producer. He received the Polish Academy Life Achievement Award in February 2006.

Hoffman is best known for his works in The Deluge (1974) and With Fire and Sword (1999), the former of which was nominated for an Academy Award for Best Foreign Language Film. His other notable credits were in Three Steps on Earth (1965) and Colonel Wolodyjowski (1969).

Career
His 1965 film Three Steps on Earth was entered into the 4th Moscow International Film Festival where it won a Silver Prize. His 1969 film Colonel Wolodyjowski was entered into the 6th Moscow International Film Festival. In 1973 he was a member of the jury at the 8th Moscow International Film Festival. In 1981 he was a member of the jury at the 12th Moscow International Film Festival. In 1985 he was a member of the jury at the 14th Moscow International Film Festival.

Hoffman directed Battle of Warsaw 1920 in 2011, the first Polish 3D feature film, stating “The fact that Poles made a film in 3D is not a miracle”.

Personal life
Hoffman was born to Jewish parents Zygmunt Hoffman and Maria Schmelkes. He is the father of early Macintosh development team member Joanna Hoffman.

Selected filmography

Battle of Warsaw 1920 (2011)
Ukraine - The Birth of a Nation (2008)
An Ancient Tale (Stara Baśń, 2003)
With Fire and Sword (Ogniem i mieczem, 1999)
A Beautiful Stranger (Piękna nieznajoma, 1992)
 (Wedle wyroków Twoich, 1983)
The Quack (Znachor, 1981)
To the Last Drop of Blood (Do krwi ostatniej, 1978)
Leper (Trędowata, 1976)
The Deluge (Potop, 1974) - nominated for a Best Foreign Film Oscar
Colonel Wolodyjowski (Pan Wołodyjowski, 1968 )
The Father (Ojciec, 1967)
The Market of Miracles (Jarmark cudów, 1966)
Three Steps on Earth (1965)
The Law and the Fist (Prawo i pięść, 1964)

See also
Cinema of Poland
List of Polish-language films
List of Polish Academy Award winners and nominees
Museum of Communism, Poland

References

External links
 
 Jerzy Hoffman at Culture.pl

1932 births
Living people
Film people from Kraków
Polish film directors
Polish screenwriters
Polish deportees to Soviet Union
20th-century Polish Jews
21st-century Polish Jews
Recipients of the Gold Medal for Merit to Culture – Gloria Artis
Officers of the Order of Polonia Restituta
Grand Crosses of the Order of Polonia Restituta
Recipients of the Gold Cross of Merit (Poland)